Murmu is a surname indicating a particular clan of the Santals found in India, Nepal, and Bangladesh. 

Draupadi Murmu (born 1958) is an Indian politician who is the current President of India. Other notable people with the name include:
Chami Murmu, (born c. 1973)  a recipient of Nari Shakti Puraskar award in 2020.
Chandrani Murmu (born 16 June 1993) is an Indian politician, a youngest Indian Member of Parliament,from Keonjhar, Odisha in the 2019 Indian general election as a member of the Biju Janata Dal.
Khagen Murmu, (born 2 February 1960) an Indian politician and a Member of Parliament from Maldaha Uttar (Lok Sabha constituency).
G. C. Murmu (born 1959), Indian Administrative Service officer
Hemlal Murmu, Indian politician and former MP from Rajmahal in 14th Lok Sabha
Jauna Murmu (born 1990), Indian sprint runner and hurdler
Raghunath Murmu (1905–1981), Indian linguist, inventor of the "Ol Chiki" script used in Santali language
Nathaniyal Murmu Memorial College a college at Tapan in the Dakshin Dinajpur district of West Bengal, India.
Nayagram Pandit Raghunath Murmu Government College in Baligeria, West Bengal, India
Pandit Raghunath Murmu Smriti Mahavidyalaya, a college in Baragari, West Bengal, India
Pandit Raghunath Murmu Medical College and Hospital a Medical college and hospital in Baripada, Odisha, India
Pandit Raghunath Murmu Teachers Training College a Training School in Murshidabad, West Bengal, India
Pt. Raghunath Academy Of Santali Cinema & Art an academy formed to promote and develop Santali films, Jamshedpur, Jharkhand.
Pandit Raghunath Murmu Smriti Mahavidyalaya, established in 1986, is the general degree college in Baragari PO Jambani, Bankura district, West Bengal
Rupchand Murmu (born 1947), Indian politician, former MP
Salkhan Murmu (born 1952), Indian socio-political activist, former MP from Mayurbhanj
Sidhu Murmu (Sidhu Kanhu), a leader of the Santhal rebellion (1855–1856)
Kanhu Murmu, a leader of the Santhal rebellion (1855–1856)
Sido Kanhu Murmu University in Jharkhand, India
Sidho Kanho Birsha University in West Bengal, India
Sidhu Kanhu Birsa Polytechnic in Keshiary, Paschim Medinipur district, West Bengal, India
Phulo Murmu & Jhano Murmu, Two sisters, Heroines of India’s Freedom movement (Santhal rebellion, 1855-1856)
Phulo Jhano Murmu College of Dairy Technology
Phulo Jhano Murmu Medical College and Hospital a Medical college and hospital in Dumka, Jharkhand, India
Bhagwat Murmu (28 February 1928 – 30 June 1998) social worker, first recipient of Padma Shri Award among Santal People, aAwarded on 16 March 1985 Member of Bihar Legislative Assembly, 1957-1962.
Sadhu Ramchand Murmu, (born 1 May 1897) a Santali Writer. His contributions are Sari Dhorom Serenj Puthi (2 parts-1969),Lita Godet (1979),Sonsar Phend (Drama), Isror (Verse),Ol Doho Onorhe (Poetry.

Anthony Murmu, (27 October 1930 – 19 April 1985) an Indian politician. He was elected to the Lok Sabha from Rajmahal, Bihar as a member of the Janata Party.
Paika Murmu (15 January 1912) was an Indian politician. He was elected to the Lok Sabha, lower house of the Parliament of India from Rajmahal, Bihar as a member of the Indian National Congress.
Rabindranath Murmu (born 1967/68) is an Indian Santali language writer from Jharkhand. He won Sahitya Akademi Award for Santali Translation in 2012.
Joyel Murmu is an Indian politician.
Sidha Lal Murmu (1 November 1935 – 4 June 1999) was an Indian politician.

Sonu Murmu (Member of Federal Parliament of Nepal, 2022-2027)

References

Indian surnames